Exaulistis is a genus of moths of the family Yponomeutidae.

Species
Exaulistis trichogramma - Meyrick, 1911 

Yponomeutidae